Antonio Sánchez Muñoz (born 22 September 1963, in Bejar) is a retired Spanish sprinter who specialized in the 400 metres. He competed in the 400 metres at the 1984 Summer Olympics and the 1988 Summer Olympics.

He won the gold medal at the 1987 Mediterranean Games and finished sixth at the 1986 European Championships in a career best time of 45.41 seconds.

He also competed at the World Championships in 1987 and 1991 and the World Indoor Championships in 1987 and 1989 without reaching the final.

References

External links

1963 births
Living people
Spanish male sprinters
Athletes (track and field) at the 1984 Summer Olympics
Athletes (track and field) at the 1988 Summer Olympics
Athletes (track and field) at the 1992 Summer Olympics
Olympic athletes of Spain
Mediterranean Games gold medalists for Spain
Mediterranean Games medalists in athletics
Athletes (track and field) at the 1987 Mediterranean Games